Strontium boride (SrB6) is an inorganic compound. At room temperature, it appears as a crystalline black powder. Closer examination reveals slightly translucent dark red crystals capable of scratching quartz. It is very stable and has a high melting point and density. Although not thought to be toxic, it is an irritant to the skin, eyes, and respiratory tract.

Magnetism
Strontium boride, along with other alkali-earth metal borides, has been shown to exhibit weak ferromagnetism at low temperatures. This is thought by some to be caused by slight impurities or aberrations in the crystal lattice, while others suggest different explanations are needed. Strontium boride has also been examined for semiconducting properties at lower temperatures.

Preparation
In his book The Electric Furnace, Henri Moissan describes an early synthesis of strontium boride by mixing strontium borate, aluminum, and carbon in an electric furnace. Alternatively, a solid-phase synthesis of strontium boride can be carried out by reacting two moles of strontium carbonate with three moles of boron carbide and one mole of carbon inside a vacuum furnace.

Uses
Strontium boride is used in insulation and nuclear control rods. A recent patent filed for aircraft windows uses SrB6 nanoparticles in a transparent acrylic sheet. The IR-absorbing properties of these nanoparticles prevents the transmittance of infrared wavelengths while still allowing the transmittance of visible light.

References

 

Borides
Strontium compounds